Shooters is a drama documentary film, directed by Dan Reed for Suspect Device Films. The film is set in Liverpool and used local criminals as actors depicting the lives of local 'gangsters'. It is most notable for having been completely unscripted apart from a brief outline; each scene was improvised and ad-libbed by the actors themselves.

Shooters was first broadcast in December 2000 on Channel 4 as part of its Cutting Edge series. The world-renowned Liverpool-born musician John Murphy co-wrote the score.

References

External links

2001 films
2000s crime drama films
British drama films
Films scored by John Murphy (composer)
Films set in Liverpool
2001 drama films
2000s English-language films
2000s British films